Jerzy Dworczyk (born 6 December 1955) is a Polish footballer. He played in one match for the Poland national football team in 1978.

References

External links
 
 

1955 births
Living people
Polish footballers
Poland international footballers
People from Sosnowiec
Association football forwards
Zagłębie Sosnowiec players
KS ROW 1964 Rybnik players
Polish football managers
Zagłębie Sosnowiec managers